Pollanisus modestus is a moth of the family Zygaenidae. It is only known from Clyde Mountain in New South Wales, Australia.

The type location is a slightly damp heath-like clearing with Hibbertia species.

The length of the forewings is about 7.5 mm for males.

External links
Australian Faunal Directory
Zygaenid moths of Australia: a revision of the Australian Zygaenidae

Moths of Australia
modestus
Moths described in 2005